Bulinus crystallinus is a species of small air-breathing freshwater snail with a sinistral shell, an aquatic pulmonate gastropod mollusk in the family Bulinidae, the ramshorn snails and their allies.

Distribution
This species is found in Angola and Gabon.

References

 Morelet, A., 1868 Mollusques terrestres et fluviatiles. In: Voyage du Dr. Friederich Welwitsch exécuté par ordre du gourvernement portugais dans les royaumes d'Angola et de Benguela, p. 102 pp
 Breure, A. S. H., Audibert, C., Ablett, J. D. (2018). Pierre Marie Arthur Morelet (1809-1892) and his contributions to malacology. Leiden: Nederlandse Malacologische Vereniging. 544 pp.

Bulinus
Gastropods described in 1868
Taxonomy articles created by Polbot